Micaela Milagros Luján is an Argentine professional boxer who has held the IBF female junior bantamweight title since January 2021.

Professional career
Luján made her professional debut on 28 January 2017, scoring a first-round knockout (KO) victory against Mileydis Mercado on 22 November 2015, at the Hotel Cisne Campestre in Puerto Colombia, Colombia.

After compiling a record of 8–1 (3 KOs), she faced reigning champion Jorgelina Guanini for the IBF female junior bantamweight title on 15 June 2019, at the Estadio F.A.B. in Buenos Aires, Argentina. After a closely contested ten-round bout, the result was announced as a majority draw to see Guanini retain her title. Two judges scoring the bout 95–95 while the third scored it 96–94 in favour of Luján.

After being out of the ring for nearly two years, she next fought on 30 January 2021, facing Débora Gómez for the vacant IBF female junior bantamweight title at the Complejo Multifuncion in Pérez, Argentina. In her second attempt at a world title, Luján emerged victorious via split decision (SD). Two judges scored the bout 97–93 in favour of Luján while the third scored it 97–93 to Gómez.

Professional boxing record

References

External links

Date of birth missing (living people)
Year of birth missing (living people)
Living people
Argentine women boxers
World super-flyweight boxing champions
International Boxing Federation champions